Oscar Sherman Gifford (October 20, 1842 – January 16, 1913) was an American lawyer of Canton, South Dakota. He served six years in the United States House of Representatives, first as the non-voting delegate from the Dakota Territory, then as a full member of the House from South Dakota.

Oscar was born in Watertown, Jefferson County, New York, and moved with his parents to Wisconsin, settling in Rock County and then in Brown County, Illinois. He served as a private in the Union during the American Civil War.

After the war Gifford studied law and was admitted to the bar in 1871, beginning his practice in Canton, Dakota Territory (now South Dakota). He was district attorney for Lincoln County, mayor of Canton, and a  member of the State constitutional convention of South Dakota which convened at Sioux Falls on September 7, 1883. He was a Republican, and was twice elected as the Territorial delegate to Congress, and served from March 4, 1885 to March 3, 1889.

Upon the admission of South Dakota as a state, it was allocated two seats in the U.S. House.  Candidates ran at-large for Seat A or Seat B.  Gifford was the first Congressman elected to Seat B, and served from November 2, 1889, to March 3, 1891. He was not a candidate for re-election in 1890, and resumed the practice of law in Canton. He was superintendent of the Canton Asylum for Insane Indians until his resignation in 1908. He continued to live in Canton, where he died on January 16, 1913. He was interred in Forest Hill Cemetery in Canton.

References

External links

1842 births
1913 deaths
Politicians from Watertown, New York
Delegates to the United States House of Representatives from Dakota Territory
Republican Party members of the United States House of Representatives from South Dakota
Mayors of places in South Dakota
19th-century American politicians
People from Canton, South Dakota
People from Brown County, Illinois
People from Rock County, Wisconsin
Union Army soldiers
People of Illinois in the American Civil War